San Vicente Airport  is an airstrip  west of San Vicente, in the Santa Cruz Department of Bolivia. The town is on the border with Brazil.

See also

Transport in Bolivia
List of airports in Bolivia

References

External links 
OpenStreetMap - San Vicente
OurAirports - San Vicente

Airports in Santa Cruz Department (Bolivia)